Leongatha is an Australian television comedy-drama series which first screened on C31 Melbourne in 2013. The series was also released as a movie the same year.

Plot
Denny Finch has been asked to film a cousin's wedding and he begrudgingly picks travels to the Victorian town of Leongatha from Wonthaggi by mini-bus  with his family members, friends, the marriage celebrant and a mysterious stranger. The trip should take no more than an hour or two becomes a very, very long one with many misadventures along the way.

Cast
 Chris Gibson as Denny Finch
 Sarah Ranken as Mazzy Smith
 Bryce Hardy as Darryl Finch
 Kate Mulqueen as Roo Finch
 Trevor Major as Bob Finch
 Roy Barker as Roy Finch
 Maureen Andrew as Lorna Finch
 Jane Menze as Jane Finch

Episodes

Awards

Antenna Awards

|-
! scope="row" rowspan="2" | 2014
| Leongatha
| Outstanding Creative Achievement In A Program 
| 
|-
| Chris Gibson
| Outstanding Male Personality
|

See also
 Under the Milky Way

References

External links
 Leongatha Official Website
 Leongatha at Australian Television Information Archive
 
 

Australian community access television shows
2013 Australian television series debuts
2013 Australian television series endings
Australian comedy-drama television series